Ray Forsberg was a college football player. He was a prominent quarterback for the Utah Utes football team. Forsberg led the nation in touchdown passes with 11 in 1930.

References

Utah Utes football players
American football quarterbacks
Year of death missing
Year of birth missing